The first series of Dani's Castle aired on 17 January 2013 and it was a spin-off from CBBC's popular series Dani's House. The series stars Dani Harmer as Dani, Kieran Alleyne as Jimmy, Niall Wright as Gabe, Shannon Flynn as Kaitlin, Lorenzo Rodriguez as Leo and Jordan Brown as Esme. It takes of when Dani has left her house and has moved on to a new life in Bogmoor. Dani has inherited a castle from Aunt Marjorie she didn't know she had. But as soon as she arrives, she gets more than she bargained for. In "Rich", Lorenzo Rodriguez makes his last appearance as Leo, and Richard Wisker guest stars as Rich.

Cast

Main Cast
 Dani Harmer as Dani
 Kieran Alleyne as Jimmy
 Niall Wright as Gabe
 Shannon Flynn as Kait
 Lorenzo Rodriguez as Leo
 Jordan Brown as Esme

Episodes

References

2013 British television seasons
series 1